In applied mathematics, an Akima spline is a type of non-smoothing spline that gives good fits to curves where the second derivative is rapidly varying. The Akima spline was published by Hiroshi Akima in 1970.

Method
At those points, its slope, is a function of the locations of the points  through .

then the spline slopes  are defined as the following

If the denominator equals zero, the slope is given as

The first two and the last two points need a special prescription, for example,

where the coefficients of the polynomial are chosen such that the four conditions of continuity of the spline together with its first derivative are satisfied,

which gives

Due to these conditions the Akima spline is a  C1 differentiable function, that is, the function itself is continuous and the first derivative is also continuous. However, in general, the second derivative is not necessarily continuous.

An advantage of the Akima spline is due to the fact that it uses only values from neighboring knot points in the construction of the coefficients of the interpolation polynomial between any two knot points. This means that there is no large system of equations to solve and the Akima spline avoids unphysical wiggles in regions where the second derivative in the underlying curve is rapidly changing. A possible disadvantage of the Akima spline is that it has a discontinuous second derivative.

References

External links
Online demo of Akima spline interpolation in TypeScript

Splines (mathematics)